Trat Province Stadium is a multi-purpose stadium in Trat Province, Thailand. It is currently used mostly for football matches and is the home stadium of Trat F.C. The stadium holds 6,000 people.

References

Football venues in Thailand
Multi-purpose stadiums in Thailand
Trat province